Midnight Taxi may refer to:

 Taxi at Midnight, a 1929 German silent thriller film
 Midnight Taxi (1937 film), an American crime film
 The Midnight Taxi, a 1928 American early part-talkie thriller film
 "Midnight Taxi" (song), a 1990 song by Miho Nakayama